Lyubka is a 2009 Russian drama film directed by Stanislav Mitin.

Plot 
The film tells about two different girls, one of whom grew up on the street and is engaged in theft, while the other was brought up in a prosperous family and studied well. And suddenly they intersect with each other in one provincial city.

Cast 
 Elena Lyadova as Lyubka
 Anastasiya Gorodentseva as Irina Michaylovna
 Natalya Chernyavskaya as Faina Semenovna - Irina's mother
 Aleksandr Sirin as Fedor Nikolaevich
 Artyom Artemev
 Marina Kudelinskaya
 Olga Onishchenko	
 Vladimir Goryushin
 Timofey Tribuntsev
 Elena Dubrovskaya

References

External links 
 

2009 films
2000s Russian-language films
Russian drama films
2009 drama films